Weichering is a municipality  in the district of Neuburg-Schrobenhausen in Bavaria in Germany.

People
Max Joseph von Pettenkofer was born in Lichtenheim.

References

Neuburg-Schrobenhausen